The Republican Spelling System (in Indonesian: , when written in the current spelling system, or , when written in this spelling system) or Soewandi Spelling was the orthography used for Indonesian from 17 March 1947 until 1972.

History 
This spelling was also called Soewandi Spelling after the Indonesian Minister of Education at the time. This spelling replaced the earlier spelling system, the Van Ophuijsen Spelling System, which was in force from 1901. While it simplified the van Ophuijsen system somewhat (notably with the introduction of the letter u and the removal of diacritics), it retained other aspects of the old system, such as the Dutch-influenced digraphs ch, dj and tj.

The Soewandi spelling was exposed to continuous crirticism from the literate community in the early fifties. The 'literate community' is not to be taken in its widest sense; those who engaged themselves in this question were particularly teachers, not unexpectedly. These shortcomings were of two kinds: partly the lack of consistent norms, particularly in the spelling of foreign and semi-naturalized words, and partly the lack of distinction between certain phonemes, which made the teaching of a correct pronunciation more difficult than it needed to be.

The Republican Spelling System was in force from 1947 until 1972, when it was replaced by the Enhanced Spelling System (EYD) when Mashuri Saleh became Minister of Education and Culture. On 23 May 1972, Mashuri legalized the usage of the Perfected Spelling System, replacing Soewandi Spelling.

Characteristics 
The differences between the Van Ophuijsen Spelling System and this system are:
 The vowel , which in the Van Ophuijsen Spelling System was written as ⟨oe⟩, became ⟨u⟩, for example  became .
 Both the prefix  and the preposition  were written without a space after the preposition or prefix. Thus, the preposition  (for example  and ) was not differentiated from the prefix  (for example  and ).
 The difference between the phonemes plain ⟨e⟩ indicated [ə] and ⟨é⟩ with an acute was used to write [ɛ] was abolished: both were to be written ⟨e⟩. 
 The difference between diphthongs and the vowel sequences (which was indicated by presence of diaeresis) was to be abolished. Both were to be written without diaeresis.

Comparison

See also
 Van Ophuijsen Spelling System
 Enhanced Indonesian Spelling System

References 

 Dari Ejaan van Ophuijsen Hingga EYD 

Indonesian language
Spelling reform